Tidy as a surname derives from the Middle English word tidef, which designated a type of small bird.

People with the name include:
 Bill Tidy (1933–2023), English cartoonist
 Charles Meymott Tidy (1843–1892), English medical man and sanitary chemist
 Frank Tidy (1932–2017), British cinematographer
 George Tidy (born 1930), Scottish footballer
 Henry Letheby Tidy (1877–1960), English physician
 Thomas Holmes Tidy (–1874), British army officer
 Thomas Tidy (1846–1892), English cricketer
 Warwick Tidy (born 1953), English cricketer

References

English-language surnames